Europaschule Humboldt-Gymnasium is a Gymnasium (high school) in Gifhorn, Lower Saxony, Germany. It is the second high school in the town after Otto-Hahn-Gymnasium and was founded in 1979. As of 2002 it had about 1000 students and 70 teachers, making it one of the largest schools in the district. Its headmaster is Michael Weiß.

History
The school was awarded the title "Europaschule" or "European school" in 1998. 

In 2009, the school won the 361-Degree Tolerance competition, which was started by YouTube, and which had the German chancellor, Angela Merkel, as patron.

References

External links 
 School website (in German)
 English project

Educational institutions established in 1979
Schools in Lower Saxony
Gifhorn
1979 establishments in West Germany